Olaf Amundsen (13 May 1876–12 December 1939) was a Norwegian lawyer and politician for the Liberal Party. 

Amundsen was elected to the Parliament of Norway for the parliamentary terms 1910-1912 and 1913–1918. He then became the Minister of Justice in the second government of Otto Blehr. The government was in office from 1921 to 1923, but Amundsen resigned his post on 24 August 1922 when he was named to the post of County Governor of Nordland county. He held the governorship until his death in 1939.

References

External links

1876 births
1939 deaths
County governors of Norway
County governors of Nordland
Ministers of Justice of Norway
People from Tromsø